Long Hoa is a ward of Hòa Thành town in Tây Ninh Province, Vietnam.

References

Populated places in Tây Ninh province